is a Japanese professional Nippon Professional Baseball player for the Saitama Seibu Lions in Japan's Pacific League.

External links

1986 births
Living people
Baseball people from Hyōgo Prefecture
Saitama Seibu Lions players
Nippon Professional Baseball pitchers
Melbourne Aces players
Japanese expatriate baseball players in Australia